Ana Júlia Carepa (born 23 December 1957) is a Brazilian politician and former Governor of the Brazilian state of Pará. She is Pará's first female governor and is a member of the Workers' Party.

References 

1957 births
Living people
Governors of Pará
Workers' Party (Brazil) politicians
Members of the Federal Senate (Brazil)
Women state governors of Brazil
People from Belém